Taiheiki (太平記) is a 1991 Japanese historical television series and the 29th NHK taiga drama. It is based on the 1958 novel Shihon Taiheiki by Eiji Yoshikawa.

Plot
Ashikaga Takauji cooperated with Emperor Go-Daigo and overthrew the Kamakura shogunate. The emperor began the Kenmu Restoration, but the samurai are more dissatisfied than before. As the leader of samurai, Takauji is worried about whether to establish a new shogunate.

Cast

Ashikaga clan
Hiroyuki Sanada as Ashikaga Takauji
Yasuko Sawaguchi as Akahashi Tōko (Tōshi), Takauji's wife
Ken Ogata as Ashikaga Sadauji, Takauji's father
Shiho Fujimura as Uesugi Kiyoko, Takauji's mother
Masanobu Takashima as Ashikaga Tadayoshi, Takauji's younger brother
Kataoka Takatarō as Ashikaga Yoshiakira, Takauji's heir
Yūsuke Morita as Senjuō (young Yoshiakira)
Michitaka Tsutsui as Ashikaga Tadafuyu, Takauji's illegitimate son
Yūichirō Yamazaki as Izayamaru (young Tadafuyu)
Yasuo Daichi as Isshiki Umanosuke
Akira Emoto as Kō no Moronao
Kazunaga Tsuji as Kō no Moroshige
Sansei Shiomi as Kō no Moroyasu
Toru Abe as Kō no Morouji
Kohji Moritsugu as Hosokawa Akiuji
Akira Yamanouchi as Kira Sadayoshi
Don Kantarō as Imagawa Norikuni

Hōjō clan (Kamakura shogunate)
Tsurutaro Kataoka as Hōjō Takatoki, the 14th shikken
Kiyoshi Kodama as Kanesawa (Hōjō) Sadaaki, the 15th shikken
Hiroshi Katsuno as Akahashi (Hōjō) Moritoki, the last shikken and Takauji's brother-in-law.
Frankie Sakai as Nagasaki Enki
Tokuma Nishioka as Nagasaki Takasuke
Tamaki Sawa as Kakukai-ni
Akane Oda as Akiko
Junkichi Orimoto as Shioya Muneharu
Chikao Ohtsuka as Doisado no Zenshi
Kunio Kaga as Adachi Moriyasu

The Imperial Court
Kataoka Takao as Emperor Go-Daigo
Daijirō Tsusumi as Prince Moriyoshi
Mieko Harada as Ano Renshi
Terutake Tsuji as Emperor Kōgon

Kugyō/Kuge
Masaomi Kondō as Kitabatake Chikafusa
Kumiko Goto as Kitabatake Akiie
Takaaki Enoki as Hino Toshimoto
Masahiro Motoki as Chigusa Tadaaki
Hōsei Komatsu as Nawa Nagatoshi
Hatsunori Hasegawa as Saionji Kinmune
Takashi Fujiki as Bōmon Kiyotada
Norihiro Inoue as Shijō Takasuke
Mitsuru Miyamoto as Nijō Michihira
Akaji Maro as Monkan
Baku Ōwada as Madenokōji Fujifusa

Nitta clan
Kenichi Hagiwara (episodes 1-7) → Jinpachi Nezu as Nitta Yoshisada
Masumi Miyazaki as Kōtō no Naishi
Yoshizumi Ishihara as Wakiya Yoshisuke

Kawachi Province
Tetsuya Takeda as Kusunoki Masashige
Mariko Fuji as Hisako
Hidekazu Akai as Kusunoki Masasue
Shigeyuki Nakamura as Kusunoki Masatsura
Seidai Katō as young Masatsura

Hanayasha Theatre Group
Kanako Higuchi as Hanayasha
Toshirō Yanagiba as Ishi
Ryō Takayama as young Ishi
Rie Miyazawa as Fujiyasha, Izayamaru's mother
Chikako Oba as young Fujiyasha
Hideki Nishioka as Kanze Kiyotsugu

Others
Takanori Jinnai as Sasaki Dōyō
Tetsu Watanabe as Akamatsu Enshin
Etsushi Takahashi as Momonoi Tadatsune
Etsushi Toyokawa
Takako Tokiwa

Production credit
Sword fight arranger - Kunishirō Hayashi

TV schedule

References

External links
NHK Official 

Taiga drama
1991 Japanese television series debuts
1991 Japanese television series endings
Television series set in the 14th century